Mattias Lindblom is a Swedish singer, writer, platinum-selling composer and music producer. He has contributed music and lyrics for artists such as Tina Arena, Andy Taylor, Tarja Turunen and Garou, as well as for musical, brands, TV and film. He is the lead singer of electronica band Vacuum. Mattias Lindblom is based in Stockholm.

Selected works
A selection of work composed by Mattias Lindblom:

 Andy Taylor (guitarist): Man’s a Wolf to Man (2022) 
 Tarja Turunen: Eye of the Storm (2022) 
 Tina Arena: Church (2021) 
 Lindblom/Hall: My Moon is a Streetlight (2020) 
 Jordan-Ravi: Pushing Stars (2020) 
 Tarja Turunen: Serene, You and I (2019) 
 Lizzy V: Little Big Secret (2018) Borderline (2019)
 Pablo Nouvelle: Harder Now feat. Sister (2018)
 LM Parfums, France: R-Campaign (2018)
 We Invented Paris: Storm (2017)
 Ewigi Liebi: Musical, Gib Mer A Chance (2017)
 Tarja Turunen: Diva, Undertaker, Calling From The Wild (2016)
 Tarja Turunen: Innocence (2016)
 Tarja Turunen: No Bitter End (2016)
 Tina Arena: Karma, Love Falls (2015)
 Tatort – Kalter Engel: Soundtrack (2013)
 The Love feat. Tina Arena: White Light (2013)
 Tina Arena: You Set Fire to My Life, Out of the Blue (2013)
 Keisha Buchanan: Fearless (2011)
 TVXQ: Y3k (2013)
 Tarja Turunen: I Walk Alone, Our Great Divide, Die Alive, Minor Heaven, We Are, In for a Kill, Into The Sun (2012), Victim of Ritual (2013), Lucid Dreamer, Deliverance, Neverlight, Boy and the Ghost, Ite, Misa Est, 
 Garou: Accidental
 Monrose: What You Don't Know
 f(x): Chu
 Rachel Stevens: Negotiate With Love
 The Canadian Tenors: I Only Know How To Love
 Till Brönner: Your Life
 Alcazar: Celebrate The Night
 Tata Young: Love Is The Law
 Girls Generation: Two Blocks Down
 Jeany Zhang Jing: Dream Whispers
 Jeanette Biedermann: Wild Like That
 Viktorious: Out Of Control
 Vengaboys: Rocket To Uranus
 Aloha From Hell: My Love You Are
 Edyta Górniak: Błękit Myśli
 Baschi: Gib Mer A Chance
 Cinema Bizarre: Heavensent, The Other People, Get Off
 Down Below: Sand In Meiner Hand
 Florence Joy: Consequence Of Love
 Julie Berthelsen: Home, Not That Song, November December
 Marilou: Impatiemment
 Rainie Young: Guai Bu Guai

References

1971 births
Living people
Swedish baritones
Swedish electronic musicians
Swedish songwriters
21st-century Swedish singers
21st-century Swedish male singers
English-language singers from Sweden